Derek Clark (born 12 June 1951) is a British sailor. He competed in the 470 event at the 1976 Summer Olympics.

References

External links
 

1951 births
Living people
British male sailors (sport)
Olympic sailors of Great Britain
Sailors at the 1976 Summer Olympics – 470
Place of birth missing (living people)